Arctomelon tamikoae is a species of sea snail, a marine gastropod mollusk in the family Volutidae, the volutes.

Description

Distribution
This species occurs off the Aleutian Islands.

References

 Bail, P.; Poppe, G.T. (2001). A conchological iconography: a taxonomic introduction of the recent Volutidae. ConchBooks, Hackenheim. 30 pp, 5 pl. 
  Clark R.N. (2018). The genus Arctomelon Dall, 1915 in Alaskan waters, with the description of a new species. The Festivus. 50(4): 256–263.
page(s): 259, figs 2, 5A-D, J

External links
 Kosuge S. (1970). Description of a new species of Volutidae from the East China Sea. Venus. 29(4): 111-113

Volutidae
Gastropods described in 1970